The Women's 100m T11 had its first round held on September 8, beginning at 20:52 and the A and B Finals were held on September 9 at 11:48.

Medalists

Results

References
Round 1 - Heat 1
Round 1 - Heat 2
Round 1 - Heat 3
Final A
Final B

Athletics at the 2008 Summer Paralympics
2008 in women's athletics